Merrick County is a county in the U.S. state of Nebraska. As of the 2020 United States Census, the population was 7,668. Its county seat is Central City.

Merrick County is part of the Grand Island, NE Metropolitan Statistical Area.

In the Nebraska license plate system, Merrick County is represented by the prefix 46 (it had the 46th-largest number of vehicles registered in the state when the license plate system was established in 1922).

History
Merrick County was formed in 1858, and was organized in 1864. It was named for Elvira Merrick, the maiden name of the wife of territorial legislator Henry W. DePuy, who introduced the bill that created the county.

When first formed, the county was bounded on the south by the Platte River, and by straight lines on the north, east, and west; enclosing 180 square miles (470 km2) of the Pawnee Reservation, which had been established in 1857. In 1873, the state legislature removed these reservation lands from the county, leaving it with a jagged northern border from which narrow panhandles extended northward from the northeast and northwest corners. In 1897, the Pawnee Reservation became Nance County.

Geography
The terrain of Merrick County is low rolling plains, sloping to the east and northeast. Most of the area is under cultivation. The Platte River flows northeastward along the southeast border line of the county. A smaller drainage, Prairie Creek, parallels the river, flowing northeastward through the center of the county before discharging into the Platte River northeast of Merrick County.

Major highways

  U.S. Highway 30
  Nebraska Highway 14
  Nebraska Highway 22
  Nebraska Highway 39
  Nebraska Highway 92

Adjacent counties

 Platte County – northeast
 Polk County – east
 Hamilton County – south
 Hall County – southwest
 Howard County – west
 Nance County – north

Demographics

As of the 2000 United States Census, there were 8,204 people, 3,209 households, and 2,307 families in the county. The population density was 17 people per square mile (7/km2). There were 3,649 housing units at an average density of 8 per square mile (3/km2). The racial makeup of the county was 98.32% White, 0.22% Black or African American, 0.10% Native American, 0.21% Asian, 0.01% Pacific Islander, 0.67% from other races, and 0.48% from two or more races. 2.05% of the population were Hispanic or Latino of any race.

There were 3,209 households, out of which 33.30% had children under the age of 18 living with them, 61.10% were married couples living together, 6.50% had a female householder with no husband present, and 28.10% were non-families. 25.00% of all households were made up of individuals, and 13.10% had someone living alone who was 65 years of age or older.  The average household size was 2.51 and the average family size was 2.99.

The county population contained 27.50% under the age of 18, 6.40% from 18 to 24, 24.70% from 25 to 44, 23.80% from 45 to 64, and 17.50% who were 65 years of age or older. The median age was 39 years. For every 100 females, there were 95.90 males. For every 100 females age 18 and over, there were 94.90 males.

The median income for a household in the county was $34,961, and the median income for a family was $39,729. Males had a median income of $26,998 versus $19,828 for females. The per capita income for the county was $15,958. About 7.00% of families and 8.90% of the population were below the poverty line, including 9.70% of those under age 18 and 9.20% of those age 65 or over.

Communities

City
 Central City (county seat)

Villages
 Chapman
 Clarks
 Palmer
 Silver Creek

Census-designated place
 Archer

Unincorporated communities

 Havens
 Lockwood
 Paddock
 Worms

Townships

 Central
 Chapman
 Clarksville
 Lone Tree
 Loup
 Mead
 Midland
 Prairie Creek
 Prairie Island
 Silver Creek
 Vieregg

Politics
Merrick County voters have been strongly Republican for decades. In no national election since 1936 has the county selected the Democratic Party candidate (as of 2020).

See also
 National Register of Historic Places listings in Merrick County, Nebraska

References

 
Grand Island micropolitan area
1864 establishments in Nebraska Territory
Populated places established in 1864